Antoni Stanisław Florian Waga (8 May 1799 – 23 November 1890) was a Polish zoologist, writer, literary critic and Piarist. He was also a collector of rare books on natural history.

Waga was born in Grabów near Kolno to Bernard and Agata née Gutowska. The botanist Jakub Ignacy Waga was his brother. He studied at a Warsaw school run by Piarists and then went to the Warsaw Lyceum. From 1818 he taught Polish, natural history and other subjects at Piarist schools. In 1820 he received a scholarship which supported a visit to the University of Berlin, Leipzig and Königsberg. He took a special interest in ornithology. He then returned to study at the University of Warsaw from 1823 and became a professor at the Warsaw Lyceum in 1826. From 1832 he was at the Warsaw Gymnasium. Waga collaborated with Aleksander and Konstanty Branicki, Franciszek K. Nowakowski and Władysław Taczanowski, travelling on collecting expeditions in Egypt, Nubia, Sudan, and Syria between 1862 and 1867. Following his retirement, he concentrated on natural history and published extensively on the Polish invertebrate fauna. He collected rare books on natural history, which included a sixteenth century book on bird hunting by Mateusz Cyganski which Waga republished in 1842. He also wrote poetry and popular texts on natural history.

References

External links 
 Biography in Polish
 Cygański, Mateusz (1584) Myślistwo ptasze - A book on bird hunting - Waga's annotated 1842 edition
 O ptakach, które wyginęły z okręgu ziemskiego  (1845) [On extinct birds] by Antoni Waga
 Żérafa : (Camelopardalis Giraffa Lin.) (1857)
 Historya naturalna : dzieło wskazujące pomoc do nauczania się téj umiejętności, uważanéj w głównych stanowiskach jéj wzrostu. T. 1 (1860)
 Flora polska : rejestra = Flora polonica (1848) with his brother

1799 births
1890 deaths
Polish naturalists
Polish ornithologists